The UC Santa Barbara Gauchos men's basketball team is the basketball team that represents University of California, Santa Barbara in Santa Barbara, California, United States. The school's team currently competes in the Big West Conference. The current head coach is Joe Pasternack.

The Blue–Green Rivalry 

The main rival of the UC Santa Barbara Gauchos men's basketball team is the Cal Poly Mustangs men's basketball team.  The rivalry is a part of the larger Blue–Green Rivalry, which encompasses all sports from the two schools.

Yearly records

Source

Postseason

NCAA tournament results
The Gauchos have appeared in six NCAA tournaments. Their combined record is 1–7.

NIT results
The Gauchos have appeared in five National Invitation Tournaments (NIT). Their combined record is 0–5.

Vegas 16 results
The Gauchos appeared in the first and only Vegas 16 tournament held. Their record was 1–1.

CBI results
The Gauchos have appeared in the College Basketball Invitational (CBI) one time. Their record is 0–1.

CIT results
The Gauchos have appeared in one CollegeInsider.com Postseason Tournament (CIT). Their combined record is 0–1.

NAIA tournament results
The Gauchos have appeared in the NAIA Tournament one time. Their record is 3–2.

Retired numbers

The Gauchos have only retired one number in program history, that of guard Brian Shaw.

Gauchos in the NBA
Richard Anderson: San Diego Clippers, Denver Nuggets, Houston Rockets, Portland Trail Blazers, Charlotte Hornets, 1982–1990
Don Ford: Los Angeles Lakers, Cleveland Cavaliers, 1975–1982
Conner Henry: Houston Rockets, Boston Celtics, Milwaukee Bucks, Sacramento Kings, 1986–1988
Orlando Johnson: Indiana Pacers, Sacramento Kings, Phoenix Suns, New Orleans Pelicans, 2012–2016
JaQuori McLaughlin: Dallas Mavericks, 2021-2022
James Nunnally: Atlanta Hawks, Philadelphia 76ers, Houston Rockets, 2014–2019
Brian Shaw: Boston Celtics, Miami Heat, Orlando Magic, Golden State Warriors, Philadelphia 76ers, Portland Trail Blazers, Los Angeles Lakers 1988–2003
John Tschogl: Atlanta Hawks, Philadelphia 76ers, 1972–1975
Gabe Vincent: Miami Heat, 2020-present
Alan Williams: Phoenix Suns, Brooklyn Nets 2015–2019

Gauchos in international basketball

Lucius Davis (born 1970)
 Max Heidegger (born 1997): American-Israeli basketball player in the Israeli Basketball Premier League
James Nunnally (born 1990): basketball player for Maccabi Tel Aviv of the Israeli Basketball Premier League and the Euroleague

References

External links